The Vrije Universiteit Brussel offers educational programmes leading to bachelor's, master's, master after master's, and doctoral degrees.

Bachelor's Programmes 

 Adult Educational Sciences
 Applied Economics 
 Biology
 Bioengineering Sciences
 Biomedical Sciences
 Business Economics 
 Business Engineering
 Business Management
 Chemistry
 Communication Studies
 Computer Sciences
 Criminology
 Pharmaceutical Sciences
 Physics
 Medicine
 Geography
 History
 Applied Sciences and Engineering
 Applied Sciences and Engineering: Architecture
 Art Sciences and Archaeology
 Physical Education and Movement Science
 Political Sciences
 Psychology
 Law
 Rehabilitation Sciences and Physiotherapy
 Social Sciences 
 Sociology
 Linguistics and Literature
 Philosophy and Ethics
 Mathematics

Master's Programmes 
A bachelor's degree is typically required for admission to a master's programme.
 Faculty of Science
 Biology
 Chemistry
 Physics
 Geography
 Applied Sciences and Engineering: Computer Science  
 Applied Informactics
 Bioscience Engineering: Cell and Gene Biotechnology
 Bioscience Engineering: Chemistry and Bioprocess Technology 
 Mathematics
 Molecular Biology  
 Biomolecular Sciences  
 UNICA Euromaster in Urban Studies (4CITIES) 
Faculty of Engineering
 Safety Engineering
 Applied Sciences and Engineering: Architectural Engineering 
 Applied Sciences and Engineering: Biomedical Engineering 
 Applied Sciences and Engineering: Civil Engineering 
 Applied Sciences and Engineering: Electronics and Information Technology 
 Applied Sciences and Engineering: Photonics 
 Applied Sciences and Engineering: Chemical and Materials Engineering 
 Applied Sciences and Engineering: Applied Computer Science 
 Applied Sciences and Engineering: Electro-Mechanical Engineering 
 Applied Sciences and Engineering: Computer Science 
 Physical Land Resources 
 Water Resources Engineering 
 Erasmus Mundus Master of Science In Photonics 
 Master of Water Resources Engineering 
 Faculty of Medicine and Pharmacy
 Biomedical Sciences
 Pharmacy
 Drug Development
 Medicine
 Master in Management, Care and Policy in Gerontology
 Management and Policy in Health Care
 Nursing and Obstetrics
 Faculty of Social Sciences & Solvay Business School
 Communication Studies: Journalism and Media in Europe 
 Communication Studies: New Media and Society in Europe 
 Sociology
 Political Science
 Solvay Master of Management 
 Solvay Master of Business Economics
 Solvay Master Business Engineering
 Solvay Master Business Engineering: Business & Technology 
 Solvay Master of International Business 
 Faculty of Psychology and Educational Sciences
 Adult Educational Sciences 
 Educational Sciences 
 Psychology
 Faculty of Physical Education and Physiotherapy
 Physical Education and Movement Sciences
 Rehabilitation Sciences and Physiotherapy
 Faculty of Law and Criminology
 Criminology
 Law
 Faculty of Arts and Philosophy
 History
 Art Sciences and Archaeology
 Linguistics and Literature: two languages (Dutch, English, German, French, Spanish, Italian and Latin)
 Philosophy and Ethics
 Information and Library Sciences

Master After Master's Programmes 
A master's degree is typically required for admission to a master after master's programme. All programmes are taught in English.
 Faculty of Law and Criminology 
 Master of International and Comparative Law (PILC) 

 Faculty of Economic, Social and Political Sciences and Solvay Business school
 Master of European Urban Cultures (POLIS) 
 Erasmus Mundus Master of Economics of International Trade and European Integration 
 Master of European Integration & Development 

 Faculty of Science
 Master of Computer Science 

 Faculty of Engineering
 Master of Nuclear Engineering 
 Faculty of Arts and Philosophy
 Master of Advanced Studies in Linguistics

Doctoral Programmes 
A master's degree is typically required for admission to a doctoral programme. 
 Philosophy 
 Ethics 
 Linguistics 
 Literature 
 Roman Languages 
 Germanic Languages 
 Classics 
 History 
 Archaeology en Arts Sciences 
 Law 
 Notary 
 Criminology 
 Psychology 
 Pedagogical Sciences 
 Economical Sciences 
 Applied Economical Sciences 
 Business Management 
 Political Sciences 
 Social Sciences 
 Communication Sciences 
 Medical-Social Sciences 
 Gerontology 
 Physical Education 
 Physiotherapy 
 Sciences 
 Engineering 
 Bio-engineering 
 Medicine 
 Dentistry 
 Pharmaceutical Sciences 
 Biomedical Sciences 

Vrije Universiteit Brussel